Pyhäjärvi is a lake in Finland. It is the largest lake in the southwestern Finland and is notable for having relatively few islands. Although the lake is eutrophicated, it is considered a good fishing lake.

References

Eurajoki basin
Lakes of Pöytyä